Girilal Jain (1924 – 19 July 1993), was an Indian journalist. He served as the editor of The Times of India from 1978 until 1988. He advocated establishing old glory and re establishing the great tenants of Hinduism aligned with nationalism and authored books on the subject, the best known of which, The Hindu Phenomenon, was published posthumously. The government of India awarded him the civilian honour of the Padma Bhushan in 1989.

Personal life
Girilal Jain was born in a rural village some 50 miles (80 kilometres) south-east of Delhi. He received a bachelor's degree from Delhi University. He married Sudarshan Jain in 1951. They had a son and three daughters, among whom include the historian Meenakshi Jain and the columnist Sandhya Jain. Sunil Jain, his son, was a journalist, who was the managing-editor of the Financial Express.

At the age of 69, Girilal Jain died on 19 July 1993.

His views
Khushwant Singh wrote that, towards the end of his career, Girilal Jain's writings showed a "distinct anti-Muslim and anti-Christian bias." Jain was reportedly fired as the editor of the Times of India as a result of his alleged Hindutva sympathies.

After retirement, he wrote on the core issues of pre independence and post partition suffering of Hindus and penned the book The Hindu Phenomenon which was edited and published by his daughter Meenakshi Jain posthumously.

Girilal Jain welcomed the movement for the Ram Temple at Ayodhya as part of the process of long lost justice for Hindus.

He believed that the political-economic order that Jawaharlal Nehru had fashioned was as much in its last throes as its progenitor, the Marxist–Leninist-Stalinist order. He believed that the two major planks of this order, secularism and socialism, have "lost much of their old glitter" while the third, non-alignment, has become redundant.

According to him, the concept of nation is alien to Hindu temperament and genius; for it emphasized the exclusion of those who did not belong to the charmed circle (territorial, linguistic or ethnic) as much as it emphasized the inclusion of those who fell within the
circle. By contrast, the essential spirit of Hinduism was inclusivist, and not exclusivist, by definition. Such a spirit must seek to abolish and not build boundaries. That is why, he held, that Hindus could not sustain an anti-Muslim feeling, except temporarily and, that too only under provocation.

Jain was criticized in the Congressional Record volume 142, issue 137, (September 28, 1996) published by the  U.S. Government Publishing Office for his 1982 Times Of India editorial titled "De-Turbaning of Sikhs" for its anti-Sikh bias.

References

External links 

Girilal Jain, 69, Editor; Backed Indira Gandhi - New York Times
Ayodhya and After - Appendix 1 - Girilal Jain on Hindu Rashtra

Indian male journalists
1924 births
1993 deaths
Hindu writers
Hindu revivalist writers
Recipients of the Padma Bhushan in literature & education
Delhi University alumni
Journalists from Delhi
20th-century Indian journalists